Meet Me On The Corner may refer to:
	
"Meet Me On The Corner", hit song by Max Bygraves Roberts, Hart 1955, covered by The Coronets With Eric Jupp And His Orchestra 1956
"Meet Me On The Corner", hit song by Lindisfarne (band), Rod Clements, 1972
"Meet Me On The Corner",  song by Jerry Cole Cole
"Meet Me On The Corner", song by Herbie Flowers	Webley, Flowers	
"Meet Me on the Corner Down at Joe's Cafe", 1974 hit song by Peter Noone